Kathleen M. Hagerty is an American academic and the Provost of Northwestern University, serving since September 2020. Prior to that, she was dean of the faculty in the Kellogg School of Management. She is the first female to be appointed provost of the university.

Education 
Hagerty earned her BA in mathematics at the University of California, Berkeley in 1975, her MS in operations research at Berkeley in 1977, and her MBA in finance at Berkeley in 1979. She was awarded her PhD in economics at Stanford University in 1985.

Career 
Hagerty has worked for 30 years at the Kellogg School of Management previously and held a Professorship of Finance, focusing her research on the field of disclosure regulations, micro structure of security marketing, and insider trading regulations.

Notes 

Year of birth missing (living people)
Stanford University alumni
Northwestern University faculty
University of California, Berkeley alumni
Living people
Kellogg School of Management faculty